The green araçari (Pteroglossus viridis), is a toucan, a near-passerine bird. It is found in the lowland forests of northeastern South America (the Guiana Shield), in the northeast Amazon Basin, the Guianas and the eastern Orinoco River drainage of Venezuela.  At 30–40 cm. (12–16 in) long and weighing 110–160 grams (3.9–5.7 oz.), it is the smallest aracari in its range, and among the smallest members of the toucan family.

Taxonomy and systematics
 The green aracari was originally classified in the genus Ramphastos. The species is named for the green feathers covering its back.

Description 
Males' crowns are black, while females' are reddish brown.

Behaviour and ecology

Breeding
Breeding occurs from February to June.  It nests in tree cavities, producing 2–4 white eggs. The parents cooperate in rearing their young.

Food and feeding
Its diet consists mostly of fruit, including the fruits of Cecropia trees and the palm Oenocarpus bacaba. The serrated edges of the green aracari's large bill help the bird to grip and gather fruit. Insects are also an occasional part of the diet, giving the birds protein.

Pets
In captivity it is the most frequently bred member of the toucan family and is the most popular as a tame hand-fed pet. It requires a large cage and toys to prevent boredom due to its active nature, and a high-fruit diet. When all these requirements are met it is an affectionate companion for many years.

References

External links 
 
 Green aracari videos on the Internet Bird Collection
 Stamps (for Guyana, Suriname) with ~RangeMap
 
 Photo-Medium Res; Article nashvillezoo—"Ramphastidae"
 Photo-High Res; Article & synopsis w/systematics arthurgrosset

green aracari
Birds of the Guianas
Birds of the Amazon Basin
green aracari
green aracari